Ludas is a village in Heves County, Northern Hungary Region, Hungary.

Communications
Ludas is  both from Road 3 and the Budapest-Miskolc railway line.

Sights to visit
 church (1794)
 Taródy palace (c. 1780)

References

External links

  in Hungarian
 foldhivatalok.geod.hu

Populated places in Heves County